Daxing'anling Prefecture, also known as Da Hinggan Ling Prefecture, is the northernmost Chinese prefecture-level division, located in northwestern Heilongjiang Province. It is named after the Greater Khingan Range (Daxing'anling; ; Amba Hinggan Dabagan) Mountains. In 2007 it had a GDP of RMB 6.1 billion and a growth rate of 11.1%. In 2015 Daxing'anling Prefecture had a GDP of RMB 13.49 billion, while a GDP of RMB 15.39 billion in the year 2014.

Administrative divisions
Daxing'anling Prefecture administrates 1 county-level city, 2 counties, and 4 administration zones. These counties and management districts contain 6 urban subdistricts, 24 towns, 11 townships, 2 ethnic townships, 41 residential communities, and 80 villages.

Forestry divisions
Administrate by the State Forestry Administration's Heilongjiang Daxing'anling Forestry Group Corporation with 10 Forestry Bureaux and 61 Woodlands.

Administrate by Daxing'anling Prefecture Administrative Operation Forestry Bureau with 3 County-level Forestry Bureaux and 6 Woodlands.

References

External links 
 Official website of Daxing'anling Prefecture government

 
Prefecture-level divisions of Heilongjiang